Esmeralda Station is a pastoral lease that currently operates as a cattle station in Queensland.

The property is mostly composed of level country fronting the Yappar, Clara Rivers and Esmeralda Creek and their tributaries.

Established at some time prior to 1884, the property was owned by De Mestre and Rowe who were trading in cattle at the time. In 1899 the property was owned by the Trust and Agency Company of Australasia Limited. Placed on the market for private sale in late 1902 the station occupied an area of  leasehold with  leasehold occupation licence and was stocked with 8,000 cattle and 150 horses. In 1905 the property was sold with no stock to John Hendry. By 1913 the property was owned by Frank Duncombe when he sold it for close to £12,000 to Bourke and Co. from Hughenden.

In 1934 the Esmeralda Pastoral Company placed the property up for auction.

The entire Gulf Country was ravaged by bushfires in 2013. The homestead at Esmeralda, constructed in the 1880s, was burnt to the ground during the fires during which thousands of hectares of feed was also lost. The Sheahan family owned the  property worth approximately 40 million at the time.

See also
List of ranches and stations

References

Stations (Australian agriculture)
Pastoral leases in Queensland
North West Queensland